Fourth finger is an ambiguous term in English language due to two competing finger numbering systems used. It might refer to either the ring finger or the little finger depending on the context.

It may refer to the ring finger in a medical context, or in a musical context when referring to keyboard instruments, like piano

It may refer to the little finger in common English, or in a musical context when referring to string instruments, like guitar, or wind instruments, like flute

See also
Fingers
First finger, second finger, third finger, fourth finger, fifth finger
Thumb, index finger, middle finger, ring finger, little finger
Fingering (music)

References

Fingers